The 2021 Supercopa de Chile (known as the Supercopa Easy 2021 for sponsorship purposes) was the ninth edition of the Supercopa de Chile, championship organised by the Asociación Nacional de Fútbol Profesional (ANFP). The match was played by the 2020 Chilean Primera División champions Universidad Católica and the 2020 Primera B de Chile champions Ñublense on 18 November 2021 at Estadio Ester Roa in Concepción.

Universidad Católica won their fourth Supercopa title and third in a row, beating Ñublense 7–6 on penalties after a 1–1 draw over 90 minutes.

Teams
The Supercopa de Chile is usually contested by the champions of the Primera División and Copa Chile of the previous year, however, since the Copa Chile was not held in 2020 due to the COVID-19 pandemic, on 27 September 2021 the ANFP decided that Ñublense, as champions of the previous Primera B season, would play the Supercopa against the Primera División champions Universidad Católica.

Details

References

2021 in Chilean football
S